Pakistan's cultural heritage includes archaeological sites, stupas, forts, shrines, tombs, buildings, residences, monuments, and  places of worship. Until the passing of the Eighteenth Amendment to the Constitution of Pakistan, some sites were under the federal government while others were in the provincial domain.

In 1997, the Pakistan Environmental Protection Agency, Ministry of Environment Pakistan, published a list of notified protected archaeological sites and monuments, according to which there are total 389 sites and monuments under federal government protection while 444 are under provincial governments. Punjab and Sindh are the only two provinces which have provincial level laws to protect heritage. Aside from these sites, there are many others which are unprotected or privately owned.

List of cultural heritage sites region wise 
The following are the region-wise lists of cultural heritage sites in the country:
 List of cultural heritage sites in Azad Kashmir
 List of cultural heritage sites in Balochistan
 List of cultural heritage sites in Federally Administered Tribal Areas 
 List of cultural heritage sites in Gilgit-Baltistan
 List of cultural heritage sites in Islamabad Capital Territory 
 List of cultural heritage sites in Khyber Pakhtunkhwa
 List of cultural heritage sites in Punjab (Lahore)
 List of cultural heritage sites in Sindh (Karachi)

References 

Monuments and memorials in Pakistan
Cultural heritage sites in Pakistan